Anthrenocerus pinto (also known as Anthrenocerus pintado) is a species of beetles, native to Australia. It is within the genus Anthrenocerus and the family Dermestidae.

References

Dermestidae